Hopfgarten can refer to:

 Hopfgarten, Thuringia, a municipality of Weimarer Land, Germany
 Hopfgarten im Brixental, in the district of Kitzbühel, Tyrol, Austria
 Hopfgarten in Defereggen, in the district of Lienz, Tyrol, Austria